Griggs is an unincorporated community in Cimarron County, Oklahoma, United States, located in the Oklahoma Panhandle.  

Griggs is east of Oklahoma State Highway 171 on E0280 Rd, then south on N0525Rd. It is approximately 22 driving miles north of Stratford, Texas and about 28 driving miles east-southeast of Boise City, the county seat.

References

Unincorporated communities in Cimarron County, Oklahoma
Unincorporated communities in Oklahoma
Oklahoma Panhandle